Callidula aruana is a moth in the family Callidulidae. It was described by Arthur Gardiner Butler in 1877. It is found on Aru of eastern Indonesia.

References

Callidulidae
Moths described in 1877